Nur ol Dinabad (also Romanized as Nūr ol Dīnābād , Nūr ed Dīnābād, and Nūr od Dīnābād) is a village in Anzal-e Jonubi Rural District, Anzal District, Urmia County, West Azerbaijan Province, Iran. At the 2006 census, its population was 140, in 25 families.

References 

Populated places in Urmia County